The Rand Rebellion (also known as the 1922 strike) was an armed uprising of white miners in the Witwatersrand region of South Africa, in March 1922. Jimmy Green, a prominent politician in the Labour Party, was one of the leaders of the strike.

Following a drop in the world price of gold from 130 shillings (£6 10s) per fine troy ounce in 1919 to 95s/oz (£4 15s) in December 1921, the companies tried to cut their operating costs by decreasing wages, and by weakening the colour bar by promoting cheaper black mine workers to skilled and supervisory positions.

History

The rebellion started as a strike by white mine workers on 28 December 1921 and shortly thereafter, it became an open rebellion against the state. Subsequently the workers, who had armed themselves, took over the cities of Benoni and Brakpan, and the Johannesburg suburbs of Fordsburg and Jeppe.

The young Communist Party of South Africa (CPSA) took an active part in the uprising on grounds of class struggle as did the syndicalists. The racist aspect was typified by the slogan; "Workers of the world, unite and fight for a white South Africa!" and by several pogroms against blacks.

Several Communists and syndicalists, the latter including the strike leaders Percy Fisher and Harry Spendiff, were killed as the rebellion was quelled by the Union Defence Force. The rebellion was eventually put down by "considerable military firepower and at the cost of over 200 lives".

Prime Minister Jan Smuts crushed the rebellion with 20,000 troops, artillery, tanks, and bomber aircraft.  By this time the rebels had dug trenches across Fordsburg Square and the air force tried to bomb but missed and hit a local church. However, the army's bombardment finally overcame them.  Lieutenant Colonel Llewellyn Andersson's role in creating the Union Defence Force (South Africa) was instrumental in crushing the rebellion. 
 
Smuts' actions caused a political backlash, and in the 1924 elections his South African Party lost to a coalition of the National Party and Labour Party. They introduced the Industrial Conciliation Act 1924, Wage Act 1925 and Mines and Works Amendment Act 1926, which recognised white trade unions and reinforced the colour bar.  Under instruction from the Comintern, the CPSA reversed its attitude toward the white working class and adopted a new 'Native Republic' policy.

In popular culture
A TV series in 8 episodes produced by the SABC in 1984 and entitled 1922, tells this part of South African history.

In Agatha Christie's The Man in the Brown Suit, published in 1924, the Rand Rebellion is mentioned both by name and as a backdrop for the mystery. Christie washes over the specifics and uses the Rebellion as nothing more than a minor inconvenience for her characters.

Bibliography
 Jeremy Krikler, Rand Revolt: The 1922 Insurrection and Racial Killings in South Africa, Jonathan Ball Publishers SA, 2006, 
 Wessel Pretorius Visser, A History of the South African Mine Workers' Union, 1902-2014, Edwin Mellen Press, 2016,

See also

 Benjamin Jennings Caddy
 Jacob van Deventer
 Ernest Glanville
 Cape Mounted Riflemen
 Light Horse Regiment
 South African Air Force

References

1921 protests
1922 protests
Conflicts in 1921
Conflicts in 1922
South African Communist Party
Syndicalism in South Africa
History of South Africa
History of Johannesburg
History of the East Rand
Protests in South Africa
1921 in South Africa
1922 in South Africa
Jan Smuts
Labour disputes in South Africa
Miners' labor disputes in Africa
Military operations involving South Africa
Revolutions of 1917–1923
Pogroms